Bangkok City Futsal Club (Thai สโมสรฟุตซอลบางกอกซิตี้) is a Thai Futsal club based in Bangkok. The club currently plays in the Thailand Futsal League. The club was created from the dissolve of Phuket United Futsal Club. Rangsan Keeyapat took over the club, re-branded and relocated it to Bangkok in 2016.

References 

Futsal clubs in Thailand
Sport in Bangkok
Futsal clubs established in 2016
2016 establishments in Thailand